Macrohydnobius is a genus of round fungus beetles in the family Leiodidae. There are about six described species in Macrohydnobius.

Species
These six species belong to the genus Macrohydnobius:
 Macrohydnobius contortus (Hatch, 1957)
 Macrohydnobius crestonensis (Hatch, 1957)
 Macrohydnobius matthewsii (Crotch, 1874)
 Macrohydnobius montanus Peck & Cook, 2009
 Macrohydnobius simulator (Brown, 1932)
 Macrohydnobius tibiocalcaris Peck & Cook, 2009

References

Further reading

 
 

Leiodidae
Articles created by Qbugbot